Antelope Lake is a lake in Day County, South Dakota, in the United States.

Antelope Lake was named for the antelope seen near it by first settlers.

See also
List of lakes in South Dakota

References

Lakes of South Dakota
Lakes of Day County, South Dakota